Thomas Hugh Collins (4 March 1895 – 19 May 1964) was an English cricketer. Collins was a left-handed batsman who bowled left-arm slow-medium.

Collins made his first-class debut in the 1921 County Championship for Nottinghamshire against Leicestershire. Collins played two first-class matches for Nottinghamshire in 1921, the last of which came against Surrey.

Fourteen years later Collins joined Hampshire for the 1935 County Championship where he played two matches against Derbyshire and finally Lancashire.

Collins died in Edwalton, Nottinghamshire on 19 May 1964.

External links
Thomas Collins at Cricinfo
Thomas Collins at CricketArchive

1895 births
1964 deaths
Cricketers from Nottingham
English cricketers
Nottinghamshire cricketers
Hampshire cricketers